Playing God is a 2021 American film written and directed by Scott Brignac and starring Luke Benward, Michael McKean, Alan Tudyk, and Hannah Kasulka. It was released in theaters and on-demand on August 6, 2021.

Premise
Playing God follows "Rachel and Micah, a brother and sister con-artist duo who find themselves scamming a grieving billionaire, Ben, by convincing him they can introduce him to God, face-to-face. They recruit their longtime mentor, Frank, to 'play' God as the three of them attempt the biggest con of their lives."

Cast
 Luke Benward as Micah
 Michael McKean as Frank
 Alan Tudyk as Ben
 Hannah Kasulka as Rachel
 Jude Demorest
 Marc Menchaca

Production
On May 14, 2018, it was announced that Scott Brignac was writing and directing a new film entitled Playing God to be produced by Aaron Benward and Russell Grove. Alongside the film's initial announcement, it was confirmed that Luke Benward, Michael McKean, Alan Tudyk, Hannah Kasulka, Jude Demorest, and Marc Menchaca had joined the film's main cast. Principal photography for the film had reportedly begun by May 2018 in Houston, Texas.

Critical Reception
Some reviewers allege a disparity between Brignac's apparent intentions and the substance of the film's plot. For instance, Glenn Kenny on RogerEbert.com, writes, "The movie’s ending...suggests that what Brignac was after has not too much to do with what ended up on screen: a parable of forgiveness with genuine theological heft." In that vein, Michael Shindler in The American Conservative compares the film unfavorably to A Serious Man, Winter Light, and Nostalgia, describing it as an instance of "pseudo-religious filmmaking" akin to God's Not Dead, and writes, "In the world as it is, inexplicable tragedy exists: helpless fawns burn in wildfires, babies die excruciating deaths from horrific diseases, plagues wipe out millions, and so on. But in Brignac’s world evil is a cardboard plot device."

References

2021 films
2020s English-language films
American comedy-drama films
American comedy thriller films
2020s American films